Digital nerve may refer to:
 Dorsal digital nerves (disambiguation)
 Palmar digital nerves (disambiguation)
 Plantar digital nerves (disambiguation)